Miss World Bangladesh is an annual national beauty pageant held in Bangladesh, owned by Engr. Mehedi Hasan, Chairman of Omicon Entertainment. The winner will compete in the Miss World pageant. 

The current Miss World Bangladesh is Rafah Nanjeba Torsa  of chittagong who was crowned on October 11, 2019 at Pan Pacific Sonargaon Hotel.

Background
Omicon Entertainment and Antar Showbiz jointly created Miss World Bangladesh to be the country's first nationwide pageant for 2 years ( 2017–2018 ). The event's mission is to support the empowerment of women and the opportunity to represent Bangladesh at an international level, from 2019 Omicon Entertainment has got the license, and they holding the event professionally. 

In October 2017, Jannatul Nayeem Avril became the first winner of Miss World Bangladesh. She was dethroned a week later, after it was discovered that she was not 26, but 27 years old and had been previously married. Jessia Islam, the runner-up, took over the title and had the rights to represent Bangladesh at Miss World 2017.

Titleholders 
Color key

See also
 Miss World

References

External links 

Beauty pageants in Bangladesh
Women in Bangladesh
Bangladeshi awards
Competitions in Bangladesh